August Ludwig Ferdinand Count von Nostitz-Ransen (27 December 1777, Zessel, near Öls – 28 May 1866, on his estates at Zobten, near Löwenberg in Schlesien) was a Prussian general who acted as adjutant general to Frederick William III of Prussia.

Early life
August Ludwig was born as the eldest son of Count Georg August von Nostitz-Ransen (1709-1795) and  his wife Baroness Johanna Christine Eleonore von Reiszwitz-Kaderzin (1756-1840). His siblings included Count Karl Wilhelm (1783-1850), Count Ludwig Georg (1784-1839), Countess Eleonore von Dyhrn (1787-1853) and Friederike Henriette von Rosen (1781-1871).

Military career
He joined the Prussian Army in 1802, leaving it in 1810 only to return in 1813 as a staff officer of the Silesian uhlans. After the battle of Bautzen he became adjutant to Gebhard Leberecht von Blücher. 

On 16 June 1815, towards the end of the battle of Ligny, Nostitz stood guard over Blücher after Blücher fell stunned under his horse and after the French Cuirassiers had passed attracted the attention of counter charging Prussian troopers who then remounted the dazed Blücher on Sergeant Schneider's horse and escorted him from the battlefield.

Nostitz became a major general in 1825 and served on Nicholas I of Russia's general staff during the Russo-Turkish War (1828–1829). 

In 1833 Nostitz became deputy commander of Berlin, then lieutenant general in 1838 and commander of the 5th Hussar Regiment (the Blüchersche Husaren) in 1840. He left active service in May 1848, was promoted to general of the cavalry in 1849 and from 1850 to 1860 served as Prussian ambassador to the Kingdom of Hanover.

Marriage and issue 
In 1829 August Georg married Countess Klara Louise Auguste von Hatzfeldt-Trachenberg (1807-1858), daughter of Prince Franz Ludwig von Hatzfeldt-Trachenberg (1756-1827) and Countess Friederike von der Schulenburg-Kennerth (1779-1832). They had one son and two daughters: 
 Countess Maria von Nostitz-Ransen (b. 1832)
 Countess Anna von Nostitz-Ransen (1833-1870); married Count Alexander von Strachwitz von Gross-Zauche und Camminetz   (1817-1866) and had issue.
 Count Wilhelm Friedrich von Nostitz-Ransen (1835-1916); married  Eleonore Alexandrine von Johnston und Kroegeborn (1868-1938) and had issue

Honours
He received the following orders and decorations:

Notes

References

Further reading

External links 
 
 

Prussian Army personnel of the Napoleonic Wars
1777 births
1866 deaths
August
People from Oleśnica County
Prussian generals
Recipients of the Iron Cross, 1st class
Recipients of the Pour le Mérite (military class)
Knights Cross of the Military Order of Maria Theresa
Recipients of the Order of St. George of the Fourth Degree
Recipients of the Order of St. Vladimir, 2nd class
Recipients of the Order of St. Anna, 1st class
Recipients of the Order of the White Eagle (Russia)
Knights of the Order of the Sword